The 89 North Bergen-Hoboken is a bus route operated by New Jersey Transit in the U.S. state of New Jersey. Buses run from Hoboken Terminal via Weehawken, Union City, West New York, and Guttenberg to Nungesser's in North Bergen.

History
Eventually the route was extended north on Bergenline Avenue, 61st Street, and Park Avenue to 77th Street. On April 8, 2006, about 1.5 months after the Bergenline Avenue station of the Hudson-Bergen Light Rail opened, several routes were reconfigured to "take advantage of the light rail system's reliability and convenience". Since the 181 was truncated to the new station, the 89 was rerouted south of that station along the former 181. The 22X was introduced as a variant of the 22, using what had been the 89 south of the station. Additionally, most 89 trips were extended north to Nungessers, since many of the 86 runs that had terminated at Nungessers were truncated to the new station.

References

General references
New Jersey Transit,

Inline citations

089
089
Bus 089